The Bonny Estuary or Bight of Bonny is an estuary on the coast of Rivers State, Nigeria near Port Harcourt. It forms part of the Campo River delta. The area is dominated by mangrove swamp, similar in vegetation to the estuarine area of the Niger Delta.

References

Rivers of Rivers State
Coasts of Nigeria
Estuaries of Nigeria